Christian Banovits (born 28 October 1981) is an Austrian football defender. He currently plays for 1. SC Sollenau.

References

Austrian footballers
Association football defenders
FC Admira Wacker Mödling players
Austrian expatriate footballers
Lombard-Pápa TFC footballers
Győri ETO FC players
Szombathelyi Haladás footballers
Austrian expatriate sportspeople in Hungary
Expatriate footballers in Hungary
First Vienna FC players
SV Würmla players
1981 births
Living people